LRF may refer to:

 LRF, the FAA and IATA codes for Little Rock Air Force Base
 LRF, a filetype variant of the Broad Band eBook format.
 Laser rangefinder, a distance sensor used in robotics
 Lambrakis Research Foundation, a Greek non-profit foundation whose activity is mainly focused on education, lifelong learning and culture
 Laogai Research Foundation, a research and advocacy organization founded by Chinese human rights activist Harry Wu
 Local Resilience Forum, a type of UK government civil contingencies organization
 Location Retrieval Function, a functional entity in the LTE network
 Land Rover Freelander
 Light Rock Fishing, a style of angling pioneered in Japan
 Little Rubber Feet, II industry acronym, the small pieces of rubber found on the bottom of IT equipment
 Federation of Swedish Farmers -- in Swedish, Lantbrukarnas Riksförbund